Michael Alpert (born 1954, Los Angeles, California) is a klezmer musician and Yiddish singer, songwriter, multi-instrumentalist, scholar and educator who has been called a key figure in the klezmer revitalization of the 1970s and 1980s.
He has played in a number of groups since that time, including The An-Sky Ensemble, Brave Old World, Khevrisa, Kapelye, The Brothers Nazaroff and Voices of Ashkenaz, and collaborated with clarinetist David Krakauer, hip-hop artist Socalled, singer/songwriter Daniel Kahn and bandurist Julian Kytasty. Alpert is also a pioneering teacher and researcher of Yiddish traditional dance and has been central to restoring Yiddish dance to its time-honored place alongside klezmer music as a key component of East European Jewish expressive culture. He is the recipient of a 2015 National Heritage Fellowship awarded by the National Endowment for the Arts, the United States government's highest lifetime honor to its folk and traditional artists.  

As of 2022 since circa 2015, Alpert continues to perform, sometimes in a duo with Scottish fiddler Gica Loening, and teach worldwide from his home in northeastern Scotland.

In addition to performance and teaching, Alpert has travelled throughout Eastern Europe and the Americas conducting ethnographic research and documentation of Jewish traditional musicians and singers. His audio and video fieldwork archive resides at the American Folklife Center of the U.S. Library of Congress, and his scholarly publications include an article in American Klezmer: Its Roots and Offshoots about Warsaw-born klezmer drummer Ben Bazyler (1922-1990). (readable here on Google Books). He can be credited with initiating the revival of rhythmic and harmonic "sekund" violin playing in klezmer music, a key technique and voice within traditional klezmer string ensembles which had fallen out of use in Yiddish music before the klezmer revitalization.

Alpert was musical director of the 1995 PBS Great Performances special Itzhak Perlman: In the Fiddler's House (1996 Emmy Award for Outstanding Cultural Music-Dance Program and Golden Rose (Montreux) for same) and co-producer of the two Perlman klezmer CDs on the Angel Records/EMI label.

References

External links

Michael Alpert 2015 article, bibliography, discography, and filmography, at Masters of Traditional Arts of Documentary Arts
Interviews with some klezmer revivalists including Alpert
In the Fiddler's House link on Amazon.com

1954 births
Living people
American violinists
Klezmer musicians
Jewish American musicians
National Heritage Fellowship winners
Musicians from Los Angeles
21st-century violinists
20th-century violinists